Kutashevo (Qotoş) is a rural locality (a village) in Lemez-Tamaksky Selsoviet, Mechetlinsky District, Bashkortostan, Russia. The population was 361 as of 2010. There are 3 streets.

Geography 
Kutashevo is located 21 km south of Bolsheustyikinskoye (the district's administrative centre) by road. Lemez-Tamak is the nearest rural locality.

References 

Rural localities in Mechetlinsky District